NGC 1000 is an elliptical galaxy located in the constellation of Andromeda. It was discovered on December 9, 1871 by Édouard Jean-Marie Stephan. It is the 1,000th object classified by the New General Catalogue.

References

Andromeda (constellation)
Elliptical galaxies
1000
10028
J02384973+4127352
MCG objects
18711209